Mark Benton Fuller is an American businessman and academic. He is the co-founder of the Monitor Group, now known as Monitor Deloitte. He served as its chairman and chief executive officer. He is also a former assistant professor at the Harvard Business School.

Early life
Mark B. Fuller is the son of Stephen H. Fuller, a former professor and associate dean at the Harvard Business School. He has a brother, Joseph B. Fuller, who is a professor at the Harvard Business School.

Fuller has a B.A. in history from Harvard College, an M.B.A. from the Harvard Business School, and a J.D. from Harvard Law School.

Career
Fuller was an assistant professor at the Harvard Business School, "where he taught courses in Strategy Formulation and Implementation, as well as industry and competitive analysis". He was also the co-director of the Project on the Auto Industry and the American Economy and a member of the Project on Negotiation at Harvard University. He authored several essays, including Business as War.

Fuller co-founded the Monitor Group (now known as Monitor Deloitte) with his brother Joseph and HBS colleague Michael Porter in 1982. He served as its chairman and chief executive officer from 1983 to 2011. He later served as a strategic advisor to the Monitor Group and the executive director of Monitor Horizons.

Fuller is chairman of the Rosc Global, a merchant banking and government services firm. He has served on the Governor's Council on Economic Growth and Technology in Massachusetts, and on Saudi Arabia's National Competitiveness Council. He has also served on the boards of directors of Grail Research, Global Precision Research in the United States, and the Bangalore-based Value Budget Housing Corporation.

Philanthropy
Fuller is a foundation member of the World Economic Forum. He has served on the board of Teach For All, the Massachusetts Society for the Prevention of Cruelty to Animals, and the Belmont Hill School.

Fuller serves on the board of governors of the Asian Institute of Management in Makati, the Philippines.

References

1953 births
American company founders
Harvard Business School alumni
Harvard Business School faculty
Harvard Law School alumni
Living people
People associated with the MSPCA-Angell